In 2014, the maiden flight of the Angara A5, Antares 120 and Antares 130 took place.

A total of 92 orbital launches were attempted in 2014, of which 88 were successful, two were partially successful and two were failures. The year also saw seven EVAs by ISS astronauts. The majority of the year's orbital launches were conducted by Russia, the United States and China, with 34, 23 and 16 launches respectively.

Overview
An Ariane 5 ES launched the Georges Lemaître Automated Transfer Vehicle, the last one of the series, which also marked 60 successfully completed Ariane 5 launches in a row.

On 22 August 2014, Arianespace launched the first two Full Operational Capability Galileo satellites for the European satellite navigation system.

A number of significant events in planetary exploration occurred in 2014, including the entry of the Rosetta spacecraft into orbit around the comet 67P/Churyumov–Gerasimenko in August 2014 and the deployment of the Philae lander to its surface in November, which marked the first orbit of and landing on a comet, respectively, and featured prominently in social media. Another notable occurrence was the entry of India's Mars Orbiter Mission into Martian orbit in September, making India the first Asian nation to reach Mars.

On 5 December 2014, a United Launch Alliance Delta IV Heavy launched the first Orion spacecraft test mission for NASA, Exploration Flight Test 1.

Orbital launches 

|colspan=8 style="background:white;"|

January 
|-

|colspan=8 style="background:white;"|

February 
|-

|colspan=8 style="background:white;"|

March 
|-

|colspan=8 style="background:white;"|

April 
|-

|colspan=8 style="background:white;"|

May 
|-

|colspan=8 style="background:white;"|

June 
|-

|colspan=8 style="background:white;"|

July 
|-

|colspan=8 style="background:white;"|

August 
|-

|colspan=8 style="background:white;"|

September 
|-

|colspan=8 style="background:white;"|

October 
|-

|colspan=8 style="background:white;"|

November 
|-

|colspan=8 style="background:white;"|

December 
|-

|}

Suborbital flights 

|}

Deep space rendezvous

Extra-Vehicular Activities (EVAs)

Orbital launch statistics

By country 
For the purposes of this section, the yearly tally of orbital launches by country assigns each flight to the country of origin of the rocket, not to the launch services provider or the spaceport. For example, Soyuz launches by Arianespace in Kourou are counted under Russia because Soyuz-2 is a Russian rocket.

By rocket

By family

By type

By configuration

By spaceport

By orbit

References

Footnotes 

 
Spaceflight by year